Sphenomorphus stellatus, the Perak forest skink or starry forest skink,  is a species of skink found in Malaysia.

References

stellatus
Taxa named by George Albert Boulenger
Reptiles described in 1900
Reptiles of Borneo